Cynthia Delaney Suwito (born 1993) is an Indonesian artist currently based in Singapore. Her works often explore themes of time and daily rituals. She is most well known for her use of instant noodles as art material.

Background
Suwito was born in Jakarta, Indonesia in 1993. She graduated with a BA in Fine Arts with first-class honours from LASALLE College of the Arts, Singapore in 2016. She is currently residing and working in Singapore.

Notable Works
Suwito's most well-known work is a performance art titled Knitting Noodles (2014), in which she knitted a length of boiled instant noodles into a scarf. In an interview with Channel News Asia, she revealed that she started using instant noodles for art in late 2014, with the concept of contrasting the instantness of the noodles with the slower pace of knitting. The resulting sculpture from the performance art, Knitted Noodles (2015) was exhibited at Harper's Bazaar Art Prize in 2015.

Holding Breath (2016- 2017) was an interactive installation which consisted of a video compilation of people holding their breaths as symbolic 'donations' to the work, a wall of certificates recording the 'donations', and an interactive segment where visitors could participate in the process during its exhibition at Affordable Art Fair 2016. It was one of her works featured at Bandung Contemporary Art Awards in 2017.

Press
Suwito started gaining worldwide recognition when her work Knitting Noodles (2014) was featured in an article by CNA in 2016.

In 2017, Suwito was featured in an article on Lianhe Wanbao. She also had a video feature by BBC, radio coverage by Busan eFM, as well as television coverage by Nippon TV and TBS.

In 2018, Suwito was featured by the Indonesian TV channel Trans7.

Awards
 2015: Harper's Bazaar Art Prize (finalist)
 2017: Forbes 30 Under 30 Asia: The Arts 
 2017: 5th Bandung Contemporary Art Award

External links
 Personal Portfolio
 Profile on Forbes

References

1993 births
Living people
Indonesian artists